The Glories of Mary is a classic book in the field of Roman Catholic Mariology, written during the 18th century by Saint Alphonsus Liguori, a Doctor of the Church.

Description
The book was written at a time when some were criticizing Marian devotions, and was written in part as a defense of Marian devotion. The book combines numerous citations in favor of devotion to the Blessed Virgin Mary from the Church Fathers and the Doctors of the Church with Saint Alphonsus' own personal views on Marian veneration and includes a number of Marian prayers and practices.

The first part of the book focuses on the Salve Regina (Hail Holy Queen) prayer and explains how God gave Mary to mankind as the "Gate of Heaven". On this topic, St. Alphonsus quoted Saint Bonaventure, "No one can enter Heaven unless by Mary, as though through a door."

The second part of the book deals with the key Marian feasts such as the Immaculate Conception, Nativity, Purification, Annunciation, Assumption, etc. The third part focuses on the Seven Sorrows of Mary, explaining how her "prolonged martyrdom" was greater than that of all other martyrs. The fourth part discusses ten different virtues of the Blessed Virgin, while the fifth part provides a collection of Marian prayers, meditations and devotions. An appendix is devoted to defending the role of Mary as  mediatrix of all graces.

References

Bibliography
 Saint Alphonsus Liguori, The Glories of Mary, Liguori Publications, 1868 , 
 EWTN
 

Christian devotional literature
Catholic Mariology